The 1980 Australian Formula 2 Championship was a CAMS sanctioned motor sport title for drivers of cars complying with Australian Formula 2 regulations. The championship was contested over a four-round series with Round 2 held as a single race and all other rounds staged over two races.
 Round 1, Winton, Victoria, 2 March
 Round 2, Amaroo Park, New South Wales, 25 May
 Round 3, Calder Raceway, Victoria, 3 August
 Round 4, Sandown Park, Victoria, 14 December

Championship points were awarded on a 9-6-4-3-2-1 basis to the top six placegetters at each round. For those rounds at which two races were held, round placings were determined by awarding round points on a 20-16-13-11-10-9-8-7-6-5-4-3-2-1 basis to the top 14 finishers in each race.

Results

References

Further reading
 Racing Car News, February 1981, pages 20–22

External links
 Australian Titles Retrieved from www.camsmanual.com.au on 6 March 2009
 Cheetah Racing Cars Retrieved from www.oldracingcars.info on 6 March 2009

Australian Formula 2 Championship
Formula 2 Championship